The Kauaʻi Educational Association for Science and Astronomy (KEASA) is a non-profit educational astronomical organization located in Mana on the Hawaiian island of Kauaʻi. It was founded in 1989. It meets monthly for star watches. Its observatory is the largest on the island and takes advantage of Kauaʻi's unique weather and topology which provide some of the best conditions for star gazing at sea level.

Observatory
It is funded as a joint venture with Kauai Community College.

The observatory houses the Bob Byers telescopes:
 A 17-inch PlaneWave Instruments corrected Dall-Kirkham Cassegrain reflector
 A Celestron HD11
 A Televue NP101

See also
 List of astronomical societies

References

Further reading

External links

1989 establishments in Hawaii
Amateur astronomy organizations
Buildings and structures in Kauai County, Hawaii
Education in Kauai County, Hawaii
Kauai
Non-profit organizations based in Hawaii